John Egan may refer to:

Sports
John Egan (basketball), basketball player who participated on Loyola University Chicago's 1963 championship team
John Egan (Dublin GAA) (1951–2007), former Dublin GAA County Chairman
John Egan (footballer, born 1937), Scottish footballer
John Egan (footballer, born 1992), Irish footballer
John Egan (Gaelic footballer) (1952–2012), Kerry player
John Egan (hurler) (active since 2010), Irish hurler and Gaelic footballer
John J. Egan (1878–1949), American college football head coach
Rip Egan (John Joseph Egan, 1871–1950), baseball player, umpire and manager
Johnny Egan (Australian footballer) (1898–1988), Australian footballer
Johnny Egan (basketball) (1939–2022), American basketball player and coach
Johnny Egan (Offaly Gaelic footballer)

Others
John Egan (Canadian politician) (1811–1857), Canadian businessman and politician
John Egan (chairman) (1750–1810), Irish barrister, politician, and chairman of Kilmainham, County Dublin
John Egan (CPR) (active 1882–1886), General Superintendent during the completion of the Canadian Pacific Railway
John Egan (harp maker) (active 1804–1838), Irish musical instrument maker
Sir John Egan (industrialist) (born 1939), British industrialist
John Egan (piper) (1840–1897), left-handed Irish piper
John Egan (Wisconsin politician) (1876–1942), American politician
John Joseph Egan (1916–2001), American Roman Catholic priest and social activist
John Treacy Egan (born 1962), American actor and singer